Roberto Maytín and Andrés Molteni was the defending champion, but they did not participate this year.

Michail Elgin and Andrey Rublev won the title, defeating Federico Gaio and Alessandro Giannessi in the final, 6–4, 7–6(7–4).

Seeds

Draw

External links
 Main Draw

ATP Challenger 2001 Team Padova - Doubles